The Hon. John George Charles Fox-Strangways (6 February 1803 – 8 September 1859) was a British diplomat, Whig politician and courtier.

Background
Fox-Strangways was the posthumous third son of Henry Fox-Strangways, 2nd Earl of Ilchester, by his second wife Maria, daughter of the Very Reverend William Digby.

Political career
Fox-Strangways was elected as the Member of Parliament for (MP) Calne in 1836, a seat he held until 1837, and then represented Dorset until 1841. He was also in the Foreign Office and served as a Gentleman Usher to Queen Adelaide.

Family
Fox-Strangways married Amelia, daughter of Edward Marjoribanks, in 1844. Their son, Henry, succeeded in the earldom of Ilchester in 1865. Fox-Strangways died in September 1859, aged 56. His wife died in September 1886.

References

External links 
 
 

1803 births
1859 deaths
Younger sons of earls
John
Members of the Parliament of the United Kingdom for English constituencies
UK MPs 1835–1837
UK MPs 1837–1841
Whig (British political party) MPs for English constituencies